The 12th edition of the annual Hypo-Meeting took place on May 24 and May 25, 1986 in Götzis, Austria. The track and field competition featured a men's decathlon and a women's heptathlon event.

Men's Decathlon

Schedule

 May 24

 May 25

Records

Results

Women's heptathlon

Schedule

 May 24

 May 25

Records

Notes

See also
 1986 European Athletics Championships – Men's decathlon
 1986 European Athletics Championships – Women's heptathlon

References
 Statistics
 decathlon2000
 1986 Year Ranking Decathlon

1986
Hypo-Meeting
Hypo-Meeting